The Second Stresemann cabinet (German: Zweites Kabinett Stresemann) was the ninth democratically elected Reichsregierung of the German Reich, during the period in which it is now usually referred to as the Weimar Republic. The cabinet was named after Reichskanzler (chancellor) Gustav Stresemann and took office on 6 October 1923 when it replaced the First Stresemann cabinet which had resigned on 3 October. Stresemann's second cabinet resigned on 23 November 1923 and was replaced on 30 November by the first cabinet under chancellor Wilhelm Marx.

Establishment
The first Stresemann cabinet resigned late on 3 October 1923 due to disagreement between the political parties over the extent to which the planned Ermächtigungsgesetz should give the government power to change the length of the working day by decree. However, the Große Koalition (grand coalition) of DVP, Social Democrats (SPD), Zentrum and German Democratic Party (DDP) was not replaced by a new constellation including the right-wing DNVP that would have been consistent with the earlier decisions taken by the DVP Reichstag fraction. Since the majority of the DVP wanted to keep Stresemann in office and it proved impossible to form a different coalition under him, the original parties once again tried to form a government. Hans von Raumer (DVP) and Rudolf Hilferding (SPD) did not return, as demanded by the DVP fraction. Raumer had already resigned on 2 October, i.e. even prior to the whole cabinet's resignation the next day. To replace Hilferding at the Ministry of Finance, Stresemann considered Hjalmar Schacht, but had to drop the idea after Schacht's actions during the occupation of Belgium during World War I became the subject of criticism. Hans Luther thus switched from Agriculture to Finance. Von Raumer's successor was Joseph Koeth, an independent former officer and Demobilisierungskommissar. , at the Ministry for Occupied Territories wanted to resign but was convinced to remain in office.  Finally, on 22 October, another independent but close to the DVP and landed interests within the DNVP, was appointed to Agriculture.

Overview of the members
The members of the cabinet were as follows:

Notes: Stresemann kept the Auswärtiges Amt and thus was his own foreign minister. It is not clear from the sources whether Schmidt retained his position as Vice-Chancellor that he held in the previous cabinet. The SPD pulled out of the coalition on 3 November and its ministers resigned. However, before the cabinet's resignation only Sollmann was replaced (by Karl Jarres on 11 November). The other positions remained vacant. Kanitz joined the cabinet only on 22 October. Previously, the position of Minister of Food and Agriculture had also been vacant.

Ermächtigungsgesetz

The Erstes Reichsermächtigungsgesetz (emergency or enabling law) was passed on 13 October. It gave the government the powers to implement by decree the measures necessary to stop hyperinflation. These included the replacement of the Papiermark with the Rentenmark on 15 November 1923. Due to a lack of gold, the new currency was backed by a special forced mortgage placed on all land in the Reich used for business or agricultural purposes.

Other major issues
The cabinet had to deal with several crucial issues that threatened the integrity of the Reich. The most pressing was the Occupation of the Ruhr, closely connected to the issue of war reparations, and the cause of economic collapse and hyperinflation brought on by the policy of passive resistance against the French and Belgian intervention.

Stresemann had announced the end of the Ruhrkampf on 26 September, but production did not resume immediately. The second Stresemann cabinet thus was closely involved in negotiations that resulted in the  a series of treaties signed between November 1923 and September 1924, named after the Mission interalliée de Contrôle des Usines et des Mines (MICUM), the French-Belgian commission for the occupied territories. It ended the ruinous period of work stoppages in heavy industry which had resulted from passive resistance. Since the payments to the occupying nations did not just reflect a resumption of reparation payments but also included recompensation for the occupation costs, they were seen as marking the failure of passive resistance and, ultimately, a capitulation by Germany to French demands.

Since these did not enjoy widespread support among the German population, they soon collapsed. The British government also resolutely opposed France's attempt to extend its sphere of influence permanently to all of Germany west of the Rhine.

Finally, there were regional challenges to the Reich government's authority from the left (Thuringia, Saxony) and the right (Bavaria). This brought on a confrontation with the government in Berlin, which asked president Ebert to declare martial law and set into motion a process of military action against the state governments of Saxony and Thuringia (Reichsexekutionen). On 23 October, Gessler ordered the Reichswehr to move into both states. In Thuringia, the militias were disbanded and the Communist ministers resigned. However, in Saxony, there was armed resistance and Zeigner refused to reshuffle his cabinet. Stresemann now appointed Rudolf Heinze Reichskommissar for Saxony. Heinze had the state government deposed and arrested.

In Bavaria, a hot-bed of right-wing opposition against the democratic Reichsregierung and now home to numerous activists - like Erich Ludendorff, Gustav von Kahr and Adolf Hitler, Ministerpäsident (prime minister) Eugen von Knilling refused to accept the authority of Stresemann's cabinet in Berlin and appointed von Kahr as Staatskommissar, in effect establishing a right-wing dictatorship in the state. It also declared martial law and considered a march on Berlin to depose the Reich government. Local commanders disobeyed orders by Hans von Seeckt, the Reichswehr's commander in chief. Since von Seeckt refused to use military force against the Bavarian government, however, there was no repeat of the events in Saxony.

On 8/9 November, Hitler launched his Beer Hall Putsch in Munich, but von Kahr failed to side with him and had it put down by local troops and police.

Withdrawal of the Social Democrats
On 2 November, the Social Democrats in the cabinet decided to withdraw from the cabinet, thereby ending the Grand Coalition. The cause was the toppling and arrest in late October of the (Social Democratic-Communist) state government of Saxony by means of a Reichsexekution. This was implemented by DVP member and former minister Rudolf Heinz. The use of a DVP man in this function was resented by the SPD. However, Hermann Müller (SPD) was willing to accept it, on the condition that the Reich government would take similar drastic steps to deal with the right-wing state government of Bavaria. This became the official position of the SPD Reichstag fraction on 31 October. It also demanded the end of the state of emergency in Saxony. This latter demand was refused by the bourgeois (DDP and DVP) ministers. In a stormy cabinet meeting on 2 November things came to a head and the SPD ministers resigned the next day.

Resignation
With the move of the SPD into opposition to the cabinet in early November, the government's period in office was now limited to the time before the Reichstag was next in session. The president of the chamber scheduled a session for 20 November. Motions of no confidence against the cabinet were to be expected on that day. Stresemann decided to go on the offensive and the bourgeois parties introduced a motion of confidence. This was voted down on 23 November by 231 against 151 (7 abstentions). Since this was not a vote of no confidence in the sense of Article 54 of the constitution, there was no legal obligation for the cabinet to resign. Nevertheless, due to the parliamentary realities, the second Stresemann cabinet resigned that day. It remained in office as acting government until the formation of the Marx cabinet on 30 November.

References

Stresemann II
1923 establishments in Germany
Cabinets established in 1923
Cabinets disestablished in 1923
Stresemann II